The 620th Engineer General Service Company was a United States Army Corps of Engineers company active during World War II whose rank and file were American soldiers, both native and foreign born who were suspected of disloyalty or subversion.

Formation 
The idea of US Army formations consisting of suspect soldiers was created by a United States Department of War order of 3 October 1942.  The units were to be composed of soldiers from all over the United States suspected, but not proved of disloyalty or subversive tendencies.  The 620th Engineer General Service Co was formed on 1 November 1942 at Fort Meade, South Dakota where it was assigned to the 7th Service Command.  In addition to the 620th, two similar units in the same command were the 358th Quartermaster Service Co. at Camp Carson, Colorado composed of suspected Italian-American and German-American soldiers. and the 525th Engineer General Service Co. at Ft. Leonard Wood, Missouri that consisted of suspected Japanese-American soldiers. An engineer general service unit's official function was to perform "general engineer work".

The company's table of organization and equipment was authorised a strength of five officers and 127 non commissioned officers and other ranks. Unlike the rest of the army, the company was dressed in the obsolete pre-war blue denim fatigue uniform that was the same uniform worn by prisoners of war with the exception that the initials "PW" were not painted on the uniforms.  The company was not allowed to bear arms.

The 620th was transferred to Camp Hale, Colorado in December 1943 due to the closure of Ft. Meade.  At the same base were the 10th Mountain Division that included several anti-National Socialist Austrian ski instructors and a group of approximately 200 German Afrika Korps prisoners of war.  The close relations between some of the company's members and the POWs led to one of the Engineers, Dale Maple, taking two of the POWs to Mexico where they were sent back across the US border and recaptured. Maple became the first soldier in the United States Army to be convicted of crime equivalent to treason.

In March 1944 the 620th was re-designated Company "A" of the 1800th Engineer General Service Battalion and assigned to Bell Buckle, Tennessee. Company "B" was formerly the 525th Engineer General Service Co  and Company "C" was formerly the 358th Quartermaster Service Co. The good treatment and apparent easy life of the unit attracted a variety of American soldiers suspected of avoiding combat duty where it was joked "a subversive word a day keeps the foxhole away"

In June 1945 Companies "A" and "C" were re-designated the 5000th Quartermaster Service Company and sent to the South West Pacific. Company "B" was re-designated the 4000th Engineer General Service Company.

Disbandment

The units were soon disbanded after the surrender of Japan.

Notes

Engineering units and formations of the United States Army
Military units and formations established in 1942
Numbered companies of the United States Army